Blanfordimys is a subgenus of voles in the family Microtus. It was formerly considered a distinct genus, but taxonomic studies group it within the Microtus radiation.

It contains the following species:
 Afghan vole (Microtus afghanus)
 Bucharian vole (Microtus bucharicus)
Juniper vole (M. juldaschi)

References

Musser, G. G. and M. D. Carleton. 2005. Superfamily Muroidea. pp. 894–1531 in Mammal Species of the World a Taxonomic and Geographic Reference. D. E. Wilson and D. M. Reeder eds. Johns Hopkins University Press, Baltimore.

Taxonomy articles created by Polbot
Microtus
Animal subgenera